Chris Myers (born ) is an American sportscaster. He has covered the Super Bowl, the World Series, the NBA Finals, the NCAA Final Four, The Masters, the U.S. Open, the Triple Crown, the Olympics, and the Daytona 500.

Early life and career
Chris Myers broke into broadcasting as a 16-year-old high school student when he hosted his own show on Miami’s WKAT radio. He graduated from Chaminade High School, followed by Miami Dade Community College and Florida International University. In the 1980s, Myers hosted a sports radio call-in show on WIOD-AM in Miami before moving to New Orleans to work for broadcast station WWL.

ESPN (1988–1998)
Myers spent ten years (1988-1998) at ESPN, hosting SportsCenter, Baseball Tonight, and other shows. He received an Emmy for the interview program Up Close, on which he was the first to conduct live interviews with O. J. Simpson after both his murder trial and wrongful death civil lawsuit.

Myers reported during the 1989 San Francisco earthquake at the World Series. He was the only on-scene reporter who stayed on the air through the night broadcasting from Atlanta during the Centennial Olympic Park bombing.

Fox Sports (1998–present)
In December 1998, Myers joined Fox Sports and Fox Sports Net, where he was one of the original anchors of The National Sports Report and the weekly sports magazine program Goin' Deep. In 2005, he debuted The Chris Myers Interview on FSN (which would later go on to become a podcast). In 2000, Myers joined Fox Sports Radio where he currently hosts his own interview show, CMI, which is heard on over 200 affiliates. Myers conducted the last public interview with the late John Wooden in April 2010 on CMI.

Myers has been the studio host for Fox NASCAR coverage since it began in 2001 up until 2018 when FOX Sports went to a studio format in their Charlotte Studios. He also serves as an announcer and/or a reporter for Fox NFL, Fox College Football, and Fox Major League Baseball, and was a reporter for Fox's coverage of the Bowl Championship Series.

Myers has been a reporter on multiple Super Bowls and World Series for the Fox television network.

Fox NFL
Myers has worked for Fox NFL (NFL on FOX) since 2003 as either a play-by-play commentator and/or a sideline reporter.

Myers has been working NFL play-by play for Fox since 2005. He has a full NFL play-by-play schedule with Daryl Johnston and sideline reporter Laura Okmin. 
Myers' previous NFL on FOX partners include: Tim Ryan and Ronde Barber.

During Fox's coverage of the NFC playoffs and the Super Bowl (when FOX has the rights to it), Myers joins Joe Buck, Troy Aikman, and Erin Andrews.

During a Detroit Lions and New Orleans Saints game, on September 13, 2009, Myers made a remark about linebacker Larry Foote's decision to leave the perennially strong Pittsburgh Steelers to play for Detroit, "That's like going from dating Beyoncé to Whoopi Goldberg!".

Myers visited the American armed forces in Qatar on behalf of Fox Sports, and gave a live broadcast with the armed forces on the pre-game show before the New Orleans Saints played the Dallas Cowboys on Thanksgiving Day 2010.

MLB on Fox
On July 14, 2012, Myers called his first MLB on Fox game with Eric Karros when the New York Mets played against the Atlanta Braves at Turner Field. Myers called MLB games for Fox in 2012 and 2013, before moving back to the studio for the 2014 season.

In 2014, Myers began hosting MLB Whiparound, a nightly show aired weeknights on Fox Sports 1 featuring quick turnaround-highlights, news, and analysis live from Los Angeles.

Fox NASCAR (2001–present)
Myers, along with Jeff Hammond, Darrell Waltrip, and Michael Waltrip, formerly hosted NASCAR RaceDay, Pizza Hut Prerace Show, and NASCAR Victory Lane during Fox's coverage of NASCAR. His first NASCAR race was the 2001 Daytona 500 where the finish was overshadowed by the death of Dale Earnhardt. Days before the beginning of the 2012 season, his son Christopher was killed in an auto accident. Myers took a bereavement leave and returned to the broadcast two weeks later. For 2019 and 2020, Myers' FOX NASCAR schedule was reduced to just the Daytona 500 only. In 2021, Myers returned to hosting pre-race coverage at the track for the entire portion of Fox’s broadcast season, this time being joined by Jeff Gordon and Clint Bowyer.

Westminster Kennel Club Dog Show (2017–present)
In 2017, Myers was named host for FS1's evening coverage of both nights of the Westminster Kennel Club Dog Show, initially with WKC Director of Communications Gail Miller Bisher, dog show judge Jason Hoke was added in 2018. Myers also in 2017, hosted Fox's annual documentary on the event, Crowned: Inside the Westminster Dog Show.

Boxing on Fox (2019–present)
In 2019, Myers began doing play-by-play and hosting for Fox's Premier Boxing Champions broadcasts.

Fox Sports: The Home Game (2020-present)
Myers hosts the sports and pop culture game show Fox Sports: The Home Game along with two celebrity guests each week.

Other appearances
Myers has hosted shows and events on the Discovery Channel, Tennis Channel, Military Channel, and Marquee Sports Network and has appeared on Jimmy Kimmel Live! numerous times. Myers also serves as the play-by-play commentator for Tampa Bay Buccaneers preseason games that air locally on WTSP-TV, after having the same role for WFLA-TV from 2003 to 2010. In 2021 Myers was named as a fill-in announcer for Chicago Cubs telecasts on Marquee Sports.

FILM Media Networks (2022–present)
Myers announced via a press release on his Instagram account  that he joined the ownership group of startup sports journalism brand, FILM Media Networks. FILM Media is the parent company to social media brands such as Gridiron on Tap, which covers the NFL and NCAA Football. Gridiron on Tap became known through viral Facebook graphics and recently launched its website to create a new avenue of journalism to provide professional fact-based reports on both the NFL and NCAA. FILM Media is also the parent company to Hoops on Tap, the newly launched Cup Series on Tap which will follow NASCAR's Cup Series providing year-round coverage. and the Gridiron on Tap Podcast Network. "I am excited to be involved on the ground floor of a credible informational and entertaining sports platform on social media such as Gridiron on Tap," Myers said in a statement on the Company's official website.

In 2001 Myers made a cameo appearance in the movie Rat Race.

References

External links

Living people
American horse racing announcers
American television sports anchors
American television sports announcers
American television talk show hosts
Myers, Chris
Chicago Cubs announcers
College basketball announcers in the United States
College football announcers
Fox Sports 1 people
Golf writers and broadcasters
Major League Baseball broadcasters
Motorsport announcers
National Basketball Association broadcasters
National Football League announcers
New Orleans television reporters
People from Miami
Sports Emmy Award winners
Tampa Bay Buccaneers announcers
Television anchors from Miami
Tennis commentators
XFL (2020) broadcasters
Year of birth missing (living people)